John Gervais was a medieval Bishop of Winchester.

Life

Gervais was a clerk of the diocese of Exeter and educated in physical sciences. He held the prebends of Fenton and Warthill in the diocese of York before becoming chancellor of the diocese of York. He made a trip to Rome on business about the election of Archbishop Sewal de Bovil to York and became a papal chaplain under Pope Alexander IV. In 1260 he was named Bishop of Carlisle by Archbishop Godfrey Ludham of York, but the election was not effective.

Gervais was nominated to the see of Winchester on 22 June 1262 by papal provision and probably consecrated on 10 September 1262. He was enthroned in Winchester Cathedral about Christmas, 1262.

Gervais died on 19 or 20 January 1268.

Citations

References
 British History Online Bishops of Winchester accessed on 2 November 2007
 British History Online Chancellors of York accessed on 2 November 2007
 

Bishops of Winchester
1268 deaths
Year of birth unknown
Bishops of Carlisle
Chancellors of the Diocese of York
13th-century English Roman Catholic bishops